Glazunov (feminine: Glazunova) is a Russian surname that may refer to:
Alexander Glazunov (1865–1936), Russian composer
Glazunov Glacier in Antarctica named after Alexander
Andrei Glazunov, 19th-century Russian trade expedition leader
Anton Glazunov (born 1986), Russian basketball player
Ilya Glazunov (1930–2017), Russian painter
Vasili Glazunov (1896–1967), Soviet general, Hero of the Soviet Union

Russian-language surnames